The McAlinden Cup was a greyhound racing competition held annually at Shelbourne Park in Dublin, Ireland. 

The race was also known by the name the Hugh McAlinden Memorial Cup. Hugh McAlinden was the chairman of Belfast Celtic F.C. and one of the founders of greyhound racing in Ireland introducing racing to Celtic Park in Belfast in 1927.

The competition was a feature competition in the Irish racing calendar and was seen as a good test for the Irish Greyhound Derby because it was held over the same race distance and course. The event was inaugurated in 1939. In 1942 it was run at Cork Greyhound Stadium for the only time in its history when it was won by 1942 Irish Greyhound Derby champion Uacterlainn Riac.

In 1944 Robeen Printer recorded 29.90 sec in the heats which was the fastest ever time recorded at Shelbourne Park by a bitch at the time.

The event lost its status as a major race and was replaced by the Champion Stakes.

Past winners

Venues & Distances
1939-1941 (Shelbourne Park, 525y) 
1942      (Cork, 525y)
1943-1976 (Shelbourne Park, 525y)

References

Greyhound racing competitions in Dublin (city)
1939 establishments in Ireland
Recurring sporting events established in 1939